Temminck's flying fox (Pteropus temminckii) is a species of flying fox in the family Pteropodidae. It is found in Indonesia. The species was classified as "Vulnerable" in 2008 by the IUCN due to threats from habitat destruction and hunting.

References

Pteropus
Bats of Oceania
Bats of Indonesia
Mammals of Papua New Guinea
Mammals of Western New Guinea
Vulnerable fauna of Asia
Vulnerable fauna of Oceania
Mammals described in 1867
Taxonomy articles created by Polbot
Taxa named by Wilhelm Peters